Berthier may refer to:

 Berthier (surname)
 Berthierville (also called Berthier-en-haut, formerly called Berthier), a town located between Montréal and Trois-Rivières
 Berthier County, former county in Quebec, Canada
 Berthier (Province of Canada electoral district)
 Berthier (provincial electoral district), in Quebec, Canada
 Berthier (electoral district)
 Berthier, a member of the Black Moon Clan, the primary villains in the Sailor Moon R manga and anime series

See also
 Berthier rifle and carbine